Klöckner can be:

 Klöckner & Co, German metal handler headquartered in Duisburg
Klöckner AG, former steel manufacturer
Klöckner Stahl, plant in Bremen
 Klöckner Pentaplast, one of the world's largest suppliers of films for pharmaceutical use
 Klöckner Stadium, home to four nationally recognized sports programs
 Manfred Klöckner, East German slalom canoer